This is a list of modern Chinese leaders since 1912. 

In this article, "China" refers to the modern territories controlled by the People's Republic of China (which controls Mainland China, Hong Kong and Macau) and the Republic of China (which controls Taiwan area). For more information, see Two Chinas, Political status of Taiwan, One-China policy, 1992 Consensus and One country, two systems.

"China" also refers to many historical states, empires and dynasties that controlled parts of what are now the PRC and the ROC. For leaders of ancient and imperial China, see List of Chinese monarchs.

| width="50%" align="left" valign="top" |
Historical parties

| width="50%" align="left" valign="top" |
Modern parties

Presidents 

List of presidents of the Republic of China (1912–present)
Paramount leader (1949–present)
List of presidents of the People's Republic of China (1949–present)

Premiers 

List of premiers of the Republic of China (1912–present)
List of premiers of the People's Republic of China (1949–present)

See also

Incumbents
 Paramount leader, an informal list of those who have been considered the highest leader of the Chinese Communist Party and the People's Republic of China
 Leader of the Chinese Communist Party
 Chairman of the Kuomintang
 List of leaders of the People's Republic of China of institutions
 List of national leaders of the People's Republic of China
 List of leaders of the Republic of China

Hong Kong and Macau
Chief Executive of Hong Kong (1997–present)
Chief Executive of Macau (1999–present)
Chief Secretary for Administration of Hong Kong (1997–present)
Secretary for Administration and Justice of Macau (1999–present)

Taiwan
Governor-General of Taiwan (1895–1945)
List of rulers of Taiwan

list of leaders
list of leaders

China politics-related lists
Leaders
China